Reallusion is a 2D and 3D character creation and animation software developer with tools from cartoon characters to digital humans and animation pipelines for films, real-time engines, video games, virtual production, archvis.

The character is core to Reallusion software in both 2D and 3D animation. The current releases from Reallusion, Character Creator 3, the Headshot plugin, iClone 7, Motion Live and 3DXchange is the Reallusion digital human pipeline with character creation, animation, motion capture and export. iClone 7, the current 3D animation tool release is a realtime character animation program with content libraries and live motion capture for face and body to animate 3D digital humans. The difference is that a Reallusion digital human is ready to animate and use in projects or productions. Reallusion develops software for solo artists and studios that provide character and animation tools for projects, collaboration and iteration. Characters created with CC3 and iClone can be exported as FBX, Alembic or transferred directly to Unreal Engine with the iClone Unreal Live Link plugin.

Reallusion cooperates with motion capture device companies to develop profiles for iClone Motion Live, a tool to choose the motion controller for face, body and hands from a list of partner devices and record full-body motion from the mix. Reallusion has connected iClone to the Unreal Engine with the iClone Unreal Live Link plugin. The iClone Unreal Live Link plugin automatically transfers and animates iClone characters, cameras and lights using iClone tools. Indies can get the plugin for free through the Reallusion indie program. The plugin is available on the Unreal Marketplace.

Reallusion launched in 2000 with its flagship animation software, CrazyTalk, a casual 2D photo animation software that is designed to make any image talk. Today it is an animation tool able to animate any photo or illustration. Reallusion has continued developing animation tools with a 2D and 3D animation line of technology that is centered around character creation and animation. In 2005 Reallusion announced iClone, the 3D character creation and animation software that would evolve over time with emphasis on UI updates and motion editing in version 4, the iClone animation pipeline FBX and device mocap with Microsoft Kinect in version 5, in 2015 the launch of Character Creator and 2018 iClone Motion Live in version 6, and now in iClone 7 the iClone Unreal Live Link, Character Creator, Headshot, and Digital Human Shader.  iClone 7 currently offers various plugins, content and companion tools like Character Creator.

Product Lines
iClone
Character Creator
Headshot plugin
iClone Unreal Live Link
iClone Motion Live
 CrazyTalk
Cartoon Animator
Motion Live 2D

History

Reallusion was founded in 2000.

References 

Animation software
3D graphics software